Elisabeth Slooten is a New Zealand zoology academic. She is currently a full professor at the University of Otago.

Biography
After secondary school in the Netherlands and a BSc and MSc in marine biology at the University of Auckland, Slooten completed a 1990 PhD from the University of Canterbury entitled Population biology, social organization and behaviour of Hector's Dolphins. Moving to the University of Otago for an extended period, she rose to the rank of full professor in 2015.

In 2004, Slooten and Stephen Michael Dawson won the Charles Fleming Award for environmental achievement from the Royal Society of New Zealand. In 2017, Slooten was selected as one of the Royal Society Te Apārangi's "150 women in 150 words", celebrating the contributions of women to knowledge in New Zealand.

Slooten has a partner, Steve Michael Dawson, also a professor of marine biology at Otago.

Selected works

References

External links
 
 New Zealand Whale and Dolphin Trust 
 institutional homepage

Academic staff of the University of Otago
New Zealand women academics
New Zealand marine biologists
Women marine biologists
Living people
Year of birth missing (living people)